Jimmy is a Hindi thriller film directed by Raj N. Sippy. The film introduces the son of Mithun Chakraborty, Mimoh Chakraborty. This was the Bollywood debut of Mimoh Chakraborty with high expectations, but it was a box office bomb. It was a remake of the 1974 movie Majboor.

Plot 
In this film, a young woman's body in cold blood is recovered by the assistant commissioner of police (Rahul Dev). All the clues (including a purse) where the girl's body was found point to Jimmy (Mimoh Chakraborty) as the killer. To everyone's surprise, including his girlfriend and mother, he confesses to the crime of killing Rithu Bhatnagar to Rahul Dev in the police station. An automobile mechanic by profession and a dance heartthrob of everyone by night, Jimmy works as a DJ in the local dance club to pay off the debts left behind by his late father. Jimmy owns up to the murder and is sentenced to death. Why would a young man on the threshold of life commit such a heinous crime? What is the real motive behind it? Only Jimmy knows the truth, and if he is not the murderer, then he knows who is. In a sudden twist of fate, Jimmy realizes in jail that he has been drawn into a vicious conspiracy. But it is too late... or is it? What follows is a spine-chilling suspense that unfolds in this fast-paced saga of crime, deceit and murder.

In the climax, the real killer is revealed and surprisingly it's Zulfi Sayed.

Cast
 Mahakshay Chakraborty as Jasminder Kumar Pushp (DJ Jimmy)
 Vivana Singh as Megha
 Zulfi Syed as Rejected Person
 Adi Irani as Rajat Sharma
 Gargi Patel as Ms. Pushp
 Prithvi as Jimmy Father 
 Vikas Anand as the Doctor
 Shakti Kapoor as Inspector Battu Singh Tobar Patialewala  
 Rahul Dev as ACP Rajeshwar Vyas

Music
"Yeh Meri Hai Daastaan" - Vijay Verma
"Marhaba Yeh Rab Mera Rooth Gaya" - Debojit Saha
"Jive Bulliya Te Aake Fariyad Nahi" - Anand Raj Anand
"Aaya Hoon, Dil Leke Aaya Hoon" - Kunal Ganjawala
"Why Not Jimmy" - Shaan, Suzanne D'Mello
"Do Minute Me De Diya Hai Dil" - Shaan, Suzanne D'Mello
"Jamaane Se Keh Do Na Hamko Sataaye" - Kailash Kher

References

External links 
 

2000s Hindi-language films
2008 films
Films scored by Anand Raj Anand
Indian action thriller films
Films directed by Raj N. Sippy
Films scored by Bappi Lahiri
2008 action thriller films
Remakes of Indian films